The 2021 North Carolina Tar Heels men's soccer team represented the University of North Carolina at Chapel Hill during the 2021 NCAA Division I men's soccer season. It was the 75th season of the university fielding a program. The Tar Heels were led by eleventh year head coach Carlos Somoano and played their home games at Dorrance Field.

The Tar Heels finished the season 11–7–2 overall and 4–4–0 in ACC play to finish in fourth place in the Coastal Division.  As the seventh overall seed in the ACC Tournament, they defeated Syracuse in the First Round, before losing to Clemson in the Quarterfinals.  They received an at-large bid to the NCAA Tournament.  As an unseeded team, they defeated Loyola (MD) via penalty shoot-out in the First Round before losing to sixth seeded New Hampshire in the Second Round.

Background

The teams' 2020 season was significantly impacted by the COVID-19 pandemic, which curtailed the fall season and caused the NCAA Tournament to be played in Spring 2021. The ACC was one of the only two conferences in men's soccer to play in the fall of 2020.  The ACC also held a mini-season during the spring of 2021.

The Tar Heels finished the fall season 3–2–2 and 3–1–2 in ACC play to finish in second place in the South Division.  In the ACC Tournament lost to Notre Dame in the Quarterfinals.  They finished the spring season 4–2–1 and 4–1–1 in ACC play, to finish in second place in the Coastal Division.  They received an at-large bid to the NCAA Tournament.  As the an unseeded team in the tournament, they progressed pass Charlotte in the Second Round via penalties, defeated Stanford in the Third Round, and Wake Forest in the Quarterfinals before losing to Marshall in the Semifinals to end their season.

At the end of the season, three Tar Heels men's soccer players were selected in the 2021 MLS SuperDraft: Matt Constant, Mark Salas and Giovanni Montesdeoca.

Player movement

Departures

Recruiting class

Squad

Roster

Team management 

Source:

Schedule

Source:

|-
!colspan=6 style=""| Exhibition

|-
!colspan=6 style=""| Regular season

|-
!colspan=6 style=""| ACC Tournament

|-
!colspan=6 style=""| NCAA Tournament

Awards and honors

2022 MLS Super Draft

Source:

Rankings

References 

2021
North Carolina Tar Heels
North Carolina Tar Heels
North Carolina Tar Heels men's soccer
North Carolina